Jacques Godin (14 September 1930 – 26 October 2020) was a Canadian film, television and stage actor. He was born in Montreal, Quebec.

Career
He won the Canadian Film Award for Best Actor at the 25th Canadian Film Awards in 1973 for his role in the film O.K. ... Laliberté, and was a nominee in the same category at the 13th Genie Awards in 1992 for Being at Home with Claude. In June 2017, Godin was made a knight in the Ordre national du Québec.

Godin died on 26 October 2020 of heart failure in Hôpital de Verdun in Montreal, aged 90.

Filmography 
 1954 : 14, rue de Galais (TV series) : Ménard, Lionel
 1955 : Cap-aux-sorciers (TV series) : Un marin
 1956 : Le Retour
 1957 : Radisson (TV series) : Pierre Esprit Radisson
 1958 : Le Courrier du roy (TV series) : Longshot
 1962 : Les Enquêtes Jobidon (TV series)
 1963 : Ti-Jean caribou (TV series)
 1964 : The Luck of Ginger Coffey : Policeman
 1965 : Septième nord (TV series) : Dr. Albert Quesnel
 1965 : Mission of Fear (Astataïon ou Le festin des morts)
 1965 : Pas de vacances pour les idoles : Gangster
 1966 : Treasure Island ("Schatzinsel, Die") (feuilleton TV) : Israël Hands
 1968 : Les Martin (TV series) : Eloi Martin
 1970 : Mont-Joye (TV series) : Eudore Meunier
 1970 : Le Gardien (TV)
 1971 : Des souris et des hommes (TV) : Lennie Small
 1972 : In the Name of the Son (Et du fils) : Noël Boisjoli
 1973 : Mademoiselle Julie
 1973 : La Dernière neige
 1973 : The Pyx (La Lunule): Superintendent
 1973 : O.K. ... Laliberté : Paul Laliberté
 1974 : Par le sang des autres : Francis
 1976 : The Man Inside (TV) : Cross
 1977 : One Man : Jaworski
 1979 : Us Two (À nous deux) : Le commandant Strauss
 1980 : Belle et Sébastien (TV series) : voix de Jonathan
 1980 : Aéroport: Jeux du hasard (TV) : David
 1981 : Yesterday : Mr. Daneault
 1981 : The Amateur: Argus
 1982 : Beyond Forty (La Quarantaine) : Tarzan
 1984 : Un amour de quartier (TV series) : Lucien Larivière
 1984 : Mario : Father
 1986 : Henri : Joseph
 1986 : Equinox (Équinoxe)
 1986 : Intimate Power (Pouvoir intime) : Théo
 1988 : Gaspard and Son (Gaspard et fil$)
 1989 : Salut Victor : Victor Laprade
 1990 : Frontière du crime (Double Identity) (TV) : Wayne
 1991 : Alisée : Georges-Étienne
 1992 : Montréal P.Q. (TV series) : Victor Téoli
 1992 : Being at Home with Claude : Inspector
 1993 : La charge de l'orignal épormyable : Mycroft Mixeudeim
 1993 : Maria des Eaux-Vives (feuilleton TV) : Frédéric
 1996 : Jasmine (TV series) : Damien Rocheleau
 1996 : Innocence (feuilleton TV)
 1996 : Night of the Flood (La nuit du déluge) : The Father
 1997 : Sous le signe du lion (TV series) : Jérémie Martin
 1997 : Lobby (TV series)
 1997 : The Haven (La Conciergerie) : Thomas Colin
 2000 : Chartrand et Simonne (TV series) : Père Abbé
 2000 : Monsieur, monsieur : Monsieur #1
 2001 : Si la tendance se maintient (TV series) : Robert Sirois
 2003 : Grande Ourse (TV series) : Dr. Mondoux
 2003 : Red Nose (Nez rouge) : Juge Godbout
 2004 : The Last Casino (TV) : Saunders
 2005 :  (TV) : General Léveillée
 2009 : The Legacy (La Donation) : Dr Yves Rainville
 2009 : Une belle mort : Le père (post-production)
 2010 : The Last Escape (La dernière fugue) : La Père
 2010 : Day Before Yesterday : The Senior Detective
 2014-2015 : Mémoires vives (TV series) : Ŕeal Pinard

References

External links 
 
 

1930 births
2020 deaths
Canadian male film actors
Canadian male television actors
Place of birth missing
Best Actor Genie and Canadian Screen Award winners
Knights of the National Order of Quebec
French Quebecers
Male actors from Montreal
20th-century Canadian male actors